James McGeachan (1871–1903) was a Scottish footballer who played in the Football League for Stoke.

Career
McGeachan was born in Govan and began his career with Hibernian before moving south to Bolton Wanderers in 1894. After two years with the Lancashire club he moved on to Stoke. He struggled to get in to the side ahead of Alf Wood and after four appearances left for a short return to Hibs. He then had an unsuccessful second spell with Bolton.

Career statistics
Source:

References

External links
 James McGeachen, www.ihibs.co.uk

1871 births
People from Govan
Footballers from Glasgow
Scottish footballers
Hibernian F.C. players
Bolton Wanderers F.C. players
Stoke City F.C. players
Scottish Football League players
English Football League players
1903 deaths
Association football defenders